Nacogdoches is the 51st studio album by country singer Willie Nelson. The album is a collection of jazz and pop standards. It is named after the city of Nacogdoches, Texas, where the album was recorded. Three of the songs on the album, Nelson had recorded previously: "Columbus Stockade Blues" on the 1970 album Columbus Stockade Blues, "Stardust" on the 1978 Stardust, and "I'm Gonna Sit Right Down and Write Myself A Letter" on the 1980 album Somewhere Over the Rainbow

Track listing
 "Please Don't Talk About Me When I'm Gone"
 "A Dreamer's Holiday"
 "Corine, Corine""
 "Walkin' My Baby Back Home"
 "To Each His Own"
 "I'm Gonna Sit Right Down and Write Myself A Letter" (Ahlert, Young)
 "Golden Earrings"
 "Columbus Stockade Blues"
 "I Can't Begin to Tell You"
 "I'll String Along with You"
 "I'm Beginning to See the Light"
 "How High the Moon"
 "Stardust"

The Players
Willie Nelson - Vocals, Guitar
Paul Buskirk - Mandolin
Paul Schmitt - Piano
Gary Weldon - Harmonica, Flugel Horn
Mike Lefebvre - Drums
Mike Nase - Bass

The Session
Produced by Willie Nelson and Paul Buskirk
Engineer - Jim Taylor
Assistant Engineer - Dana Woods, Mike Ward, Spence Peppard
Pro Tools Engineer - Wayne Chance
Mastered by Jerry Tubb
Recorded at Encore Studio, Nacogdoches, Texas

2004 albums
Willie Nelson albums
Columbia Records albums